The Michigan Shore-to-Shore Trail (also known as the Michigan Riding and Hiking Trail) is a  trail that runs between Empire on Lake Michigan and Oscoda on Lake Huron across the Lower Peninsula of Michigan. It is open to horseback riders and hikers but not bicycles. 

The trail's western end is located within the Sleeping Bear Dunes National Lakeshore. The trail was developed by trail riders in 1962 and travels through mixed hardwood and conifer forests. Public campgrounds are located throughout the route.

Michigan has many other important and scenic trails.  Chief among them is the North Country National Scenic Trail.

Notes

External links
Tips on traveling the trail by horse
Michigan Hiking Trails, list and links.
Michigan Trail Riders - horseback trailriding

Hiking trails in Michigan
Long-distance trails in the United States
Protected areas of Oscoda County, Michigan
Protected areas of Leelanau County, Michigan
Protected areas of Kalkaska County, Michigan